Apisai Tauyavuca (born 1 April 1993 in Suva, Fiji) is a Fijian rugby union player who previously played for the Houston SaberCats in Major League Rugby (MLR). His usual position is as a Lock or Flanker.

In 2017, Tauyavuca was a member of the Fijian Drua squad  and for 2018-19 Pro14 and 2019-20 Pro14 seasons he played for Zebre .

References

External links
It's Rugby Profile
Profile Player

1993 births
Fijian rugby union players
Houston SaberCats players
Living people
Zebre Parma players
Fijian Drua players
Rugby union locks
Rugby union flankers